Guy Levy (born September 8, 1966), is an Israeli retired footballer who played as a defender. Today, Levy is a team manager that previously managed the Israel national under-21 football team.

Honours

As a Player
Israeli Premier League
Runner-up (3): 1988–89, 1989–90, 1990–91
State Cup
Winner (1): 1992
Runner-up (1): 1991
Toto Cup
Winner (3): 1985–86, 1989–90, 1990–91

As a Manager
Israeli Second Division
Runner-up (1): 1997–98
Toto Cup
Winner (1): 2000–01
Toto Cup Leumit
Winner (1): 2008–09
Qualified to 2007 UEFA European Under-21 Football Championship

Personal life
He is the son of former Israel Football Association chairman, Gavri Levy.

References

1966 births
Living people
Israeli Jews
Israeli footballers
Israeli football managers
Footballers from Petah Tikva
Association football defenders
Hapoel Petah Tikva F.C. players
Liga Leumit players
Hapoel Petah Tikva F.C. managers
Hapoel Tzafririm Holon F.C. managers
Hapoel Kfar Saba F.C. managers
Bnei Yehuda Tel Aviv F.C. managers
Hapoel Be'er Sheva F.C. managers
Hapoel Nir Ramat HaSharon F.C. managers
Hapoel Haifa F.C. managers
Apollon Limassol FC managers
Hapoel Ramat Gan F.C. managers
Bnei Sakhnin F.C. managers
Beitar Jerusalem F.C. managers
Israeli people of Bulgarian-Jewish descent